Jean-Marie Lemaire (born 15 June 1936) is a retired Belgian rower. He competed at the 1960 Summer Olympics in the double sculls event, with Gérard Higny, and finished in sixth place.

References 

1936 births
Living people
Belgian male rowers
Rowers at the 1960 Summer Olympics
Olympic rowers of Belgium
Sportspeople from Liège